Jared Antonio Farrow (born October 14, 1987), better known by his stage name Jay Pharoah, is an American stand-up comedian, actor, impressionist, rapper, and singer. Pharoah was a cast member on NBC's sketch comedy series Saturday Night Live from 2010 to 2016. In 2015, he was ranked the 55th greatest Saturday Night Live cast member by Rolling Stone magazine.

Early life
Pharoah was born and raised in Chesapeake, Virginia. He began performing impersonations at age six and cites Gilbert Gottfried's character Iago in Aladdin as his first voice, explaining, "My father put me in a talent competition a couple of months later, and out of the whole thing I got fifth place."

In 2005, Pharoah graduated from Indian River High School in Chesapeake. One of his characters, Principal Daniel Frye, is heavily influenced by IRHS's former principal, James Frye. Pharoah studied business at Tidewater Community College and Virginia Commonwealth University.

Career

Pharoah has been performing stand-up comedy in community theaters and at comedy clubs in Virginia since he was 15. He at one point toured with Corey Holcomb and Charlie Murphy.

He became known for his many celebrity impressions, including Barack Obama, Will Smith, DMX, Jay-Z, 50 Cent, Eddie Murphy, Chris Rock, Kanye West, Stephen A. Smith, Peter Dinklage, and Denzel Washington.

Pharoah became an internet phenomenon when his impersonation of Barack Obama became widely seen on YouTube.

2010–2016: Saturday Night Live
In 2010, Pharoah was hired by Saturday Night Live as a featured performer for the show's 36th season. Pharoah debuted on Saturday Night Live on September 25, 2010 and was regarded by Rob Moynihan of TV Guide as the "breakout player" for that season, for his impersonations of Barack Obama, Ben Carson, Kanye West, Jay-Z, Stephen A. Smith, Will Smith, Eddie Murphy, Tracy Morgan, Chris Rock, Chris Tucker, Michael Strahan, Lil Wayne, Kendrick Lamar, and Denzel Washington. He debuted his SNL impersonation of Barack Obama in the 38th season premiere on September 15, 2012, succeeding Fred Armisen in that role. Rolling Stone magazine described him as the "Jimmy Fallon of 2 Chainz impressions."

Pharoah appeared in the independent film Lola Versus, released by Fox Searchlight Pictures in June 2012. In 2014, he had a small role in the buddy cop film Ride Along, starring Ice Cube and Kevin Hart, and appeared in the independent film Balls Out, a sport comedy starring fellow SNL cast members Beck Bennett and Kate McKinnon.

In 2016, he appeared in a commercial for Old Navy, alongside fellow SNL cast members Nasim Pedrad and Cecily Strong. On August 8, 2016, it was announced Pharoah alongside fellow cast member Taran Killam would be exiting the show ahead of its 42nd season. Pharoah hosted the American Music Awards of 2016 with model Gigi Hadid. Pharoah has been working on his first album with record producer Myles William.

Personal life

2020 encounter with police
In June 2020, amidst the ongoing George Floyd protests, Pharoah released footage showing how, in April 2020, he was detained at gunpoint by the Los Angeles Police Department, with an officer kneeling on Pharoah's neck in the same manner as that which caused the murder of George Floyd. Pharoah had met the generic description of a "black man in grey sweatpants and a grey shirt." After the officers googled Pharoah's name, they apologized and let him go.

Filmography

Film

Television

Video games
 Call of Duty: Infinite Warfare (2016) – Andre

References

External links

1987 births
21st-century American male actors
African-American male comedians
American male comedians
African-American male actors
American impressionists (entertainers)
American male film actors
American male television actors
American male voice actors
American sketch comedians
African-American stand-up comedians
American stand-up comedians
Living people
Male actors from Virginia
American twins
People from Chesapeake, Virginia
Virginia Commonwealth University alumni
21st-century American comedians
21st-century African-American people
20th-century African-American people